In the duel between future married couples and multiple winners Nell Hall and Harry Hopman defeated 
Marjorie Cox and Jack Crawford 11–9, 3–6, 6–3 in the final, to win the mixed doubles tennis title at the 1930 Australian Championships.

Seeds

  Daphne Akhurst /  Gar Moon (semifinals)
  Louie Bickerton /  Jim Willard (semifinals)
  Marjorie Cox /  Jack Crawford (final)
  Sylvia Harper /  Jack Hawkes (quarterfinals)

Draw

Finals

Earlier rounds

Section 1

Section 2

Notes

References

External links
 Source for seedings 

1930 in Australian tennis
Mixed Doubles